Charles Leslie Hall (born December 2, 1948 in Yoakum, Texas) is a former American football linebacker in the National Football League. He was drafted by the Cleveland Browns in the third round of the 1971 NFL Draft. He played college football at Houston.

1948 births
Living people
American football linebackers
Houston Cougars football players
Cleveland Browns players